Žemba, female Žembová , is a Slovak surname. Notable people with the surname include:

Maroš Žemba (born 1986), Slovak ice hockey player
Vladimír Žemba (born 1988), Slovak ice hockey player

See also
 Zemba

Slovak-language surnames